Melitaea diamina, the false heath fritillary, is a butterfly of the family Nymphalidae.

Subspecies 
Subspecies include:
 Melitaea diamina alpestris Fruhstorfer, 1917
 Melitaea diamina badukensis Alberti, 1969 (Caucasus)
 Melitaea diamina codinai Sagarra, 1932 (Spain)
 Melitaea diamina diamina (Lang, 1789)
 Melitaea diamina erycina (Lederer, 1853) (Altai)
 Melitaea diamina erycinides Staudinger, 1892
 Melitaea diamina hebe (Borkhausen, 1793)
 Melitaea diamina vernetensis Rondou, 1902

Distribution and habitat
This species is widespread in central and southern Europe (from northern Spain, southern and eastern France, Italy and eastwards into southern Scandinavia and Bulgaria), southern Siberia, north-eastern China, southern Ussuri, Korea and Japan. These butterflies live in damp flowery meadows, woodland margins and rides from low to alpine levels up to 2200 m.

Description 
Melitaea diamina has a wingspan of 36–42 mm. Females are larger than males. This medium-sized species is highly variable in extent of black markings and in the diversification of ground colour on the upperside of the wings. The upper side of the wings usually is black brown, with yellowish-orange ground colour and white chequered fringe. On the upperside of the hindwings there are very heavy dark markings. Sometimes it may be uniformly dark brown. The underside of the hindwings shows a submarginal series of white half moons and a few bands of creamy-white and orange checkers.

This species is rather similar to Melitaea varia, Melitaea parthenoides, Melitaea aurelia, Melitaea britomartis, Melitaea deione, Melitaea asteria and Melitaea athalia.

Biology
This species usually has a single brood from May to July depending on the altitude. In some warmer regions it may have a second generation. Caterpillars feed on Valeriana officinalis, Valeriana sambucifolia, Valeriana dioica, Valeriana wallrothii, Filipendula ulmaria, Veronica chamaedrys, Plantago lanceolata, Melampyrum pratense, Melampyrum nemorosum, Polygonum bistorta and Patrinia  species. Pupation occurs on the host plants near to the ground. Adults fly from May to September.

Gallery

Bibliography 
 Ebert, G. & E. Rennwald (1993). Die Schmetterlinge Baden-Württembergs, Bd. 1., Stuttgart (Verlag Eugen Ulmer), pp. 508–513. 
 Mitchell Beazley (1981). The Mitchell Beazley Pocket Guide to Butterflies. Mitchell Beazley, London. p 76.
 Schweizerischer Bund FÜR Naturshutz [eds.] (1987). Tagfalter und ihre Lebensräume. Arten – Gefährdung – Schutz, Fotorotar AG, Egg, Zurich. pp. 220–221.
 Tom Tolman, Richard Lewington - Guide des papillons d'Europe et d'Afrique du Nord, Delachaux et Niestlé,

References

External links 

 Paolo Mazzei, Daniel Morel, Raniero Panfili Moths and Butterflies of Europe and North Africa
 Butterflies.de
 Papillons du Poitou-Charente

Melitaea
Butterflies of Europe